Bumpei Akaji (1921–2002) was an American sculptor from Hawaii. He was known for welding large copper and brass sculptures which can be seen all over Hawaii as part of Hawaii's Art in Public Places program.

Biography 
Akaji was born in Lawai, on the Hawaiian island of Kauai in 1921. In 1943 he joined the United States Army and was sent to Italy with the 100th Battalion of the 442nd Regimental Combat Team. He was inspired by the frescoes and mosaics he saw in Florence and Ravenna. After discharge from the army, he stayed in Italy to study at the Academy of Fine Arts in Florence and at the Academia de Belle Arti, Brera, on a Fulbright Scholarship.  In 1950, he returned to Honolulu, and in 1951, was the first to receive a Master of Fine Arts in sculpture from the University of Hawaii at Manoa. Akaji was a member of the Metcalf Chateau, a group of seven Asian-American artists with ties to Honolulu. In 1959 he created his first commission, which displayed at the Ala Moana Center.

Akaji learned welding from a local mechanic and is now best known for his large-scale welded copper and brass sculptures, which are both organic and abstract in nature, as typified by Cyparissus. The welded and/or pounded surfaces of his sculptures are often warm and sensual and over time develop a unique patina.

He died in 2002.

Works 
The Hawaii State Art Museum and the Honolulu Museum of Art are among the public collections holding Akaji's work. Many of his works were commissioned by the state as part of Hawaii's Art in Public Places program, which designates 1% of construction funds in new public buildings to acquiring art. His sculptures in public places include:

 Untitled sculpture, Leilehua High School, Honolulu, Hawaii, 1976 
 Na Mana Nu Oli, Bishop Trust Company, Honolulu, Hawaii, 1969
 Koaie, Anuenue Elementary School, Honolulu, Hawaii, 1972
 Nani Kaua`i: Ke Mau Nei Ke Ea O Kauai I Puhi Aina Malu (Beautiful Kaua`i: The spirit of Kaua`i thrives in  the peaceful land of Puhi), Kauai Community College, Lihue, Hawaii, 1977 
 Untitled sculpture, Hana High and Elementary School, Hana, Hawaii, 1977
 Pule Oo, Molokai Public Library, Kaunakakai, Hawaii, 1973 
 Reflections 1989, Kauai High School, Lihue, Hawaii, 1989
 Makaa eIke Aku i ke Awawa Uluwehi i na Kuahiwi o Manoa (Glowing Eyes Looking at the Lush Valley in the Mountains of Manoa, 1979) and VVV (1995), University of Hawaii at Manoa, Honolulu, Hawaii, 1995
 Moanalua, Moanalua High School, Honolulu, Hawaii, 1976
 Pupu Ao Ewa, Ewa Beach Community School, Honolulu, Hawaii, 1972 
 Gushing Waters, Waipahu Elementary School, Honolulu, Hawaii, 1978
 Wilia i uka, wilia i kai, Pope Elementary School, Honolulu, Hawaii, 1977
 Hana Hihi-u O Na Makani Ika-ika O Hono Kaa, Honakaa School, Honokaa, Hawaii, 1975 
 Hoolana, University of Hawaii at Hilo, Hilo, Hawaii, 1984
 Maui Snares the Sun, Maui Memorial Hospital, Wailuku, Hawaii, 1981
 The Sun God, Wailuku State Office Building, Wailuku, Hawaii, 1970 
 The Eternal Flame, Hawaii State Capitol Mall, Honolulu, Hawaii, 1974
 Birds Aloft, Ala Moana Center, Honolulu, Hawaii, 1966 
 Wai Hoola a Lono, Koloa Public School & Library, Koloa, Hawaii, 1973
 Brothers in Valor Memorial, Fort DeRussy Military Reservation, Honolulu, Hawaii, 1996
 Untitled copper sculpture, President William McKinley High School, Honolulu, Hawaii, 1963

References
 Hartwell, Patricia L. (editor), Retrospective 1967–1987, Hawaii State Foundation on Culture and the Arts, Honolulu, Hawaii, 1987, p. 133

Footnotes

1921 births
2002 deaths
Modern sculptors
United States Army personnel of World War II
American artists of Japanese descent
United States Army soldiers
American military personnel of Japanese descent
University of Hawaiʻi at Mānoa alumni
People from Kauai
Sculptors from Hawaii
20th-century American sculptors
American male sculptors
American expatriates in Italy
20th-century American male artists